Baskonia B is the reserve team of Baskonia. It currently plays in Liga EBA, the fourth tier of Spanish basketball.

History
In the 2000–01 season, it played in Liga EBA with Tiago Splitter as its most important player. In 2012, the team becomes to Fundación 5+11 from the agreement between the club and Deportivo Alavés, the main football club in Vitoria-Gasteiz. In 2016, the club requests to the FEB a place in the Spanish 2nd-tier level LEB Oro for the 2016–17 season. In 2017, the request of the club has been accepted by the FEB and the team will occupy a place in the Spanish 3rd-tier level LEB Plata for the 2017–18 season.

Players

On loan

Head coaches
Jon Txakartegi 2017–2018
Miguel Ángel Hoyo 2018–2021

Season by season

References

External links
Official website
Baskonia B at FEB.es

Basque basketball teams
Sport in Vitoria-Gasteiz
Liga EBA teams
Former LEB Plata teams